Anna Louise Meredith  is Professor of Conservation Medicine at the University of Edinburgh, where she has previously served as chairperson of zoological conservation medicine at the Royal (Dick) School of Veterinary Studies.

Early life and education 
Meredith's mother was a biology teacher. She was inspired by her mother's care for the planet, and joined the World Wide Fund for Nature. Her first job was at an animal and horse practise in Edinburgh. She worked alongside David Shannon, the veterinary surgeon for the Edinburgh Zoo. Meredith studied physiology at the University of Oxford and graduated in 1986. She qualified in veterinary medicine at the University of Cambridge in 1999. Meredith worked in general practice for a year before moving to the Royal (Dick) School of Veterinary Studies (R(D)SVS) as a lecturer.

Research and career 
Meredith established the Exotic Animal and Wildlife Unit at the Royal (Dick) School of Veterinary Studies, which was the first in the United Kingdom. In 1992 she was appointed Head Veterinary Surgeon for the Royal Zoological Society of Scotland (RZSS) Edinburgh Zoo. She worked to embed exotic animal wildlife into the undergraduate curriculum. She was present for the key hole surgery that took place on a giraffe in 2004.

On the merit of her clinical and teaching work, Meredith was promoted to professor in 2015, before earning her doctorate. She worked on conservation medicine and the intersection of animal and human health. She has worked with Scottish Wildcat Action to protect her favourite species, the Scottish wildcat. She is interested in the diseases that are present in the wildcat population, and was part of the trap, neuter, vaccinate and release project.

Meredith completed a PhD in 2012 supervised by Sarah Cleaveland on the use of carnivores as sentinels – animals which can provide information about the ecosystems they live in. Meredith studied the antibodies inside foxes and used this to understand what animals were eating. Meredith and her research group found bacteria that cause leprosy in red squirrels in the United Kingdom. She also led a project to reintroduce beavers to Scotland, which had been hunted to extinction 300 years ago. Beavers are important in the maintenance of ecosystems; including forests and streams.

In 2010 Meredith was appointed chairperson of the Government of the United Kingdom Zoos Expert Committee. She has also served as a specialist for the European College of Zoological Medicine. Meredith served as director of postgraduate taught programmes. In June 2018 Meredith was made head of the Melbourne Veterinary School in the University of Melbourne Faculty of Veterinary and Agricultural Sciences. Meredith left her role at the University of Melbourne in January 2022. Her period as Head of Melbourne Veterinary School is controversial, as it was marked by the resignation of many staff and the closure of much of the school’s teaching hospital.

Awards and honours 
Her awards and honours include;

 2003 British Small Animal Veterinary Association Blaine Award
 2016 Appointed to the Scottish Science Advisory Council
 2018 Elected to the council of the Scottish Wildlife Trust
 2019 Appointed Officer of the Order of the British Empire for services to veterinary surgery in the 2019 New Year Honours

Meredith was elected a Fellow of the Royal College of Veterinary Surgeons (FRCVS).

Books 
Meredith has contributed to several books, including;

 BSAVA Manual of Exotic Pets
 Wildlife Medicine and Rehabilitation: Self-Assessment Color Review
 BSAVA Manual of Rabbit Medicine
 BSAVA Small Animal Formulary: Part B: Exotic Pets

References 

British veterinarians
Women veterinary scientists
Women veterinarians
Alumni of the University of Oxford
Alumni of the University of Cambridge
Academics of the University of Edinburgh
Academic staff of the University of Melbourne
Year of birth missing (living people)
Living people
Officers of the Order of the British Empire
Fellows of the Royal College of Veterinary Surgeons